Guam has competed in eight Summer Games and one Winter Games. Guam first participated in the Olympics in the Winter Games in 1988 when Judd Bankert became Guam's first Olympic athlete competing in the biathlon. Only two athletes from Guam, canoeist Sean Pangelinan and judoka Ricardo Blas Jr, have made it past the first round of competition. During the 2008 Games in Beijing, Pangelinan advanced to the C-1 500m semi-finals and Blas Jr progressed to the Round of 16 100 kg+ Judo competition at London 2012.

Medal tables

Medals by Summer Games

Medals by Winter Games

Olympic participants

Summer Olympics

Winter Olympics

See also
 List of flag bearers for Guam at the Olympics
 Tropical nations at the Winter Olympics

References

External links